Beann Eadair GAA is a Gaelic Athletic Association club in based in Howth, Fingal.

The club has an adult men's and ladies football team and boys' and girls' underage football hurling and camogie teams at various levels.

Achievements
 Dublin Junior Football Championship: (1) 1974

External links
 

Gaelic games clubs in Fingal
Gaelic football clubs in Fingal